Worcestershire Constabulary was the territorial police force responsible for policing rural Worcestershire in central England from 1839 until 1967, when it became part of West Mercia Constabulary.

History
The Worcestershire Constabulary was formed in 1839, along with borough forces in the towns of Worcester, Evesham, Kidderminster, Dudley, Bewdley and Droitwich. The first headquarters was a three storey house at 15 Britannia Square, Worcester. In 1946 they moved into Hindlip Hall.

In 1947 the Worcester Constabulary absorbed Kidderminster Borough Constabulary. On 1 October 1967 the Worcestershire Constabulary was amalgamated with the Shropshire Constabulary, Herefordshire Constabulary and Worcester City Police to form the West Mercia Constabulary, later the West Mercia Police.

See also
 List of defunct law enforcement agencies in the United Kingdom

References

Government agencies established in 1839
Organisations based in Worcestershire
Defunct police forces of England
1839 establishments in England
1967 disestablishments in England